The 2017 Premier Volleyball League (PVL) season was the first season of the Premier Volleyball League (14th season of the former Shakey's V-League). There were three conferences for this season.

Women's division

Reinforced Conference

Participating teams

Preliminary round

Quarterfinals

Final round

Final standings

Awards

Open Conference

Participating teams

Preliminary round

Final round

Final standings

Awards

Collegiate Conference

Participating teams

Preliminary round

Final round

Final standings

Awards

PVL on Tour
The Premier Volleyball League's “PVL on Tour” staged by Sports Vision and Grid Athletic Sports, organizer of the immensely successful Beach Volleyball Republic, the October tour of the PVL marks the first time ever in its storied history that Sports Vision is bringing its games to the countryside. Matches were held in the People's Gym in Tuguegarao City, Batangas City Sports Complex, Iloilo Sports Complex and La Salle Coliseum in Bacolod.

Match results
 All times are in Philippines Standard Time (UTC+08:00)

 Sta. Rosa, Laguna
The Premier Volleyball League goes to Laguna on Sunday (December 17, 2017) for its “PVL on Tour” with three matches set to be held at the Sta. Rosa Sports Complex. Participating teams in this 5th leg of the PVL on Tour are Pocari Sweat, Philippine Air Force, Adamson University, San Sebastian College, Far Eastern University and BanKo-Perlas.
Match results

Men's division

Reinforced Conference

Participating teams

Preliminary round

Fourth-seed playoff

Final round

Final standings

Awards

Open Conference

Participating teams

Preliminary round

Fourth-seed playoff

 Sta. Elena Wrecking Balls advances to the semifinals round.

Final round

Final standings

Awards

Collegiate Conference

Participating teams

Preliminary round

Final round

Final standings

Awards

Conference Results

All-Star 

The PVL All-Star is an exhibition match put up by the Premier Volleyball League for a successful year-long staging of the country's premier league.

Event was held October 29, 2017 at the Filoil Flying V Centre, San Juan City. The Women's Division is split into two teams, with BaliPure Water Defenders head coach Roger Gorayeb taking the coaching duties for Red Team while Rico De Guzman of Pocari Sweat Lady Warriors will serve as White Team's coach. On the men's side, the players are split between Coach Oliver Almadro's Blue Team and Vhyl Verayo's Yellow Team. Post-season special event set to raise funds for the benefit of Help Educate and Rear Orphans (HERO) Foundation.

Match results
 All times are in Philippines Standard Time (UTC+08:00)

References

 
2017 in Philippine sport